Katsuyuki Dobashi (土橋 勝征, born December 5, 1968) is a former Nippon Professional Baseball infielder.

External links

1968 births
Living people
Japanese baseball players
Nippon Professional Baseball infielders
Yakult Swallows players
Tokyo Yakult Swallows players
Japanese baseball coaches
Nippon Professional Baseball coaches
Baseball people from Chiba Prefecture